These are the full results of the 2015 South American Championships in Athletics which took place in Lima, Peru, from 12 to 14 June at the Estadio Atlético “La Videna”.

Men's results

100 meters

Heat 1 – 12 June 14:50h - Wind: -0.8 m/s

Heat 2 – 12 June 14:50h - Wind: -0.9 m/s

Heat 3 – 12 June 14:50h - Wind: -0.9 m/s

Final – 12 June 18:40h - Wind: -1.1 m/s

200 meters

Heat 1 – 13 June 14:50h - Wind: -0.7 m/s

Heat 2 – 13 June 14:50h - Wind: -2.0 m/s

Heat 3 – 13 June 14:50h - Wind: -1.1 m/s

Final – 14 June 11:15h - Wind: 0.0 m/s

400 meters

Heat 1 – 12 June 10:20h

Heat 2 – 12 June 10:20h

Final – 12 June 18:10h

800 meters
Final – 14 June 10:00h

1500 meters
Final – 13 June 16:50h

5000 meters
Final – 12 June 17:00h

10,000 meters
Final – 14 June 9:00h

110 meters hurdles

Heat 1 – 12 June 11:10h - Wind: 0.6 m/s

Heat 2 – 12 June 11:10h - Wind: -1.1 m/s

Final – 12 June 16:20h - Wind: -1.2 m/s

400 meters hurdles
Final – 13 June 15:50h

3000 meters steeplechase
Final – 14 June 12:10h

High jump
Final – 12 June 15:00h

Long jump
Final – 13 June 16:00h

Triple jump
Final – 14 June 11:30h

Pole vault
Final – 12 June 10:00h

Shot put
Final – 13 June 10:00h

Discus throw
Final – 12 June 10:00h

Javelin throw
Final – 12 June 15:00h

Hammer throw
Final – 14 June 9:00h

20,000 meters walk
Final – 12 June 7:30h

4x100 meters relay
Final – 13 June 18:40h

4x400 meters relay
Final – 14 June 13:00h

Decathlon
Final – 13 June 18:00h

Women's results

100 meters

Heat 1 – 12 June 16:45h - Wind: -1.1 m/s

Heat 2 – 12 June 14:30h - Wind: -1.7 m/s

Final – 12 June 18:50h - Wind: -1.0 m/s

200 meters

Heat 1 – 13 June 14:30h - Wind: -1.4 m/s

Heat 2 – 13 June 14:30h - Wind: -1.3 m/s

Final – 14 June 11:00h - Wind: -0.9 m/s

400 meters

Heat 1 – 12 June 10:00h

Heat 2 – 12 June 10:00h

Final – 12 June 18:00h

800 meters
Final – 14 June 9:50h

1500 meters
Final – 12 June 15:30h

5000 meters
Final – 14 June 10:15h

10,000 meters
Final – 12 June 19:15h

100 meters hurdles
Final – 12 June 16:40h - Wind: -2.2 m/s

400 meters hurdles
Final – 13 June 15:30h

3000 meters steeplechase
Final – 14 June 11:50h

High jump
Final – 14 June 10:45h

Long jump
Final – 13 June 11:15h

Triple jump
Final – 12 June 16:30h

Pole vault
Final – 13 June 14:30h

Shot put
Final – 14 June 9:30h

Discus throw
Final – 13 June 14:30h

Javelin throw
Final – 14 June 11:40h

Hammer throw
Final – 13 June 11:20h

20,000 meters walk
Final – 13 June 7:00h

4x100 meters relay
Final – 13 June 18:20h

4x400 meters relay
Final – 14 June 12:50h

Heptathlon
Final – 14 June 11:30h

References

Events at the South American Championships in Athletics
South American Championships in Athletics - Results